The Asahi Beer Silver Star are an American football team located in Kawasaki City, Kanagawa, Japan.  They are a member of the X-League.

Team history
1970 Team Founded 
1989 Won first Tokyo Super Bowl championship.
1993 Won first Rice Bowl National Championship. 
1999 Won fourth Tokyo Super Bowl championship. 
2009 Won Eastern divisional title. Advanced to the Final stage where they lost to eventual X-League runner up, the Fujitsu Frontiers 31-21.

Seasons
{| class="wikitable"
|bgcolor="#FFCCCC"|X-League Champions (1987–present)
|bgcolor="#DDFFDD"|<small>Division Champions</small>
|bgcolor="#D0E7FF"|Final Stage/Semi-finals Berth
|bgcolor="#96CDCD"|Wild Card /2nd Stage Berth
|}

Current Import PlayersFormer Import Players'''

References

External links
  (Japanese)

American football in Japan
1970 establishments in Japan
American football teams established in 1970
X-League teams